The 2015 Trophée des Champions was the 20th edition of the French supercup. The match was contested by the 2014–15 Ligue 1 and Coupe de France champions Paris Saint-Germain and the runners-up of the Ligue 1, Lyon. The match was played at Saputo Stadium in Montreal, Quebec, Canada. 

This was the seventh consecutive time the competition had taken place on international soil and the second time it was contested in Montreal. PSG were the two-time defending champions, having defeated Guingamp in the 2014 edition, which was played in China.

Match

Details

See also 
 2014–15 Ligue 1
 2014–15 Coupe de France

References

External links 
  

Trophee des champions
Trophee des champions
2015
International club association football competitions hosted by Canada
Paris Saint-Germain F.C. matches
Olympique Lyonnais matches
Sports competitions in Montreal
Soccer in Quebec
August 2015 sports events in Canada
2010s in Montreal
2015 in Quebec